Samuel Gotthold Lange (born 22 March 1711 in Halle (Saale); died 25 June 1781 in Beesenlaublingen, Bernburg district) was a German poet.

Biography
He was the son of the pietist Joachim Lange. He studied theology at Halle, and there became acquainted with Pyra, with whom he wrote Thyrsis' und Damons freundschaftliche Lieder (1745), attacked Gottsched, whom they had both ardently followed before, and opposed the use of rhyme in poetry. His strongest claim to fame is the feeble version of Horace's Odes (1752), which Lessing criticised and, when roused by Lange's fling that the critic's works because of their small format were only ‘Vademecums,’ overpowered with the brilliancy of his Vade Mecum für Lange (1754).

Notes

References
 

1711 births
1781 deaths
University of Halle alumni
German poets
German male poets